Tove Enblom (born 20 November 1994) is a Swedish footballer who plays KIF Örebro in the Damallsvenskan in Sweden as a goalkeeper. Enblom played for Djurgårdens IF Dam from 2012 to 2013, where she played 27 games. Enblom played for Umeå IK.
Enblom is as of 2018 holdning the position as first goalkeeper in IFK Kalmar.

References

External links
  (archive)
 
 

1994 births
Swedish women's footballers
Living people
Djurgårdens IF Fotboll (women) players
Umeå IK players
Damallsvenskan players
IFK Kalmar players
Women's association football goalkeepers
Footballers from Stockholm